Rhagastis confusa, the indistinct mottled hawkmoth, is a moth of the family Sphingidae.

Distribution 
It is known from northern India, Nepal, northern Thailand, south-western China and northern Vietnam.

Description 
The wingspan is 84–90 mm. It is similar to Rhagastis albomarginatus albomarginatus but distinguishable by the almost uniform olive-green ground colour of the forewing upperside and the lack of a small black discal spot on the hindwing underside.

Biology 
Larvae have been recorded feeding on Vitis species in India.

References

Rhagastis
Moths described in 1903